Arevadasht, is a village in the Armavir Province of Armenia.

Arevadasht has a population of 283 at the 2011 census, down from 375 at the 2001 census.

The village is home to the "Karas" brandy factory.

References

Populated places in Armavir Province